Robert Paul Rose (born 27 December 1964) is an American-Australian retired professional basketball player. He played the majority of his career in the Australian National Basketball League (NBL), where he won a championship with the South East Melbourne Magic in 1992 and was a two-time NBL Most Valuable Player in 1993 and 2001. Rose was nicknamed "Australia's Michael Jordan" due to his clutch shooting and defensive abilities.

College career
Rose played collegiately for the George Mason Patriots from 1982 to 1986. During his senior season, he led the Patriots to their first National Invitational Tournament (NIT). Rose was a second-team All-ECAC South selection in 1985 and a first-team All-CAA selection in 1986. He ranks in the top 10 of points (9th), rebounds (9th), steals (3rd), blocks (6th), field goal percentage (4th), free throw percentage (8th) and free throws made (9th) in Patriots program history.

Professional career
Rose played 2 games in the NBA for the Los Angeles Clippers in the 1988-89 season after signing a 10-day contract. He played just 3 minutes. He later played in the Philippine Basketball Association for the Purefoods Hotdogs in the 1990 Reinforced Conference and helped the team win their first ever championship despite getting injured in the final game.  He began his NBL career in 1992 with the South-East Melbourne Magic, leading his team to the championship - which would prove to be his only one. The next year Rose would average 18.6 points, 7.5 rebounds and 8.5 assists per game on his way to the National Basketball League MVP.

Rose signed to play with the Adelaide 36ers for the 1994 NBL season under a new 36ers coach, former NCAA coach Mike Dunlap. Rose combined with Mark Davis, Mike McKay, Phil Smyth and Brett Maher to lead the team to the 1994 NBL Grand Final Series where they were defeated by the North Melbourne Giants in two games (Rose averaged 32 points for the series), as well as the 1995 Semi-Finals against the Perth Wildcats. During his time in Adelaide Rose won the club's 1994 and 1995 MVP awards and was selected to the 1995 NBL All-Star Game played at Adelaide's Clipsal Powerhouse, where he won the game MVP award.

Rose then signed for a three-year stint with the Canberra Cannons where he was selected to the All NBL First Team in both 1996 and 1997. After not enjoying any post season success with the Cannons he signed with the struggling North Queensland team of the Townsville Crocodiles. Rose would turn the franchise around captaining them to the semi-finals and grand final in the 1999-2000 and 2000-01 seasons. Rose capped off his team's performance by winning his second league MVP award. However the Crocodiles would be defeated by the Wollongong Hawks in the deciding game three of the grand final series.

After the 2005-06 season, at age 42, the Crocodiles decided not to renew Rose's contract. He then signed with North Queensland rivals the Cairns Taipans for the 2006-07 season before retiring at the end of the year having played in 472 NBL games.

NBL career stats

References

External links
NBA stats @ basketballreference.com

1964 births
Living people
Adelaide 36ers players
African-American basketball players
American emigrants to Australia
American expatriate basketball people in Australia
American expatriate basketball people in the Philippines
American men's basketball players
Australian men's basketball players
Basketball players from New York (state)
Cairns Taipans players
Canberra Cannons players
George Mason Patriots men's basketball players
Los Angeles Clippers players
Magnolia Hotshots players
Mississippi Jets players
Philippine Basketball Association imports
Point guards
Quad City Thunder players
Shooting guards
South East Melbourne Magic players
Sportspeople from Rochester, New York
Townsville Crocodiles players
Undrafted National Basketball Association players
Wichita Falls Texans players
21st-century African-American people
20th-century African-American sportspeople